This list of Asian animals extinct in the Holocene features animals known to have become extinct in the last 12,000 years on the Asian continent and its islands.

Many extinction dates are unknown due to a lack of relevant information.

Mammals

Undated

Prehistoric

Recent

Local

Birds

Undated

Prehistoric

Recent

Local

Reptiles

Amphibians

Fish

Earthworms

Molluscs

See also 
 Holocene extinction
 List of extinct animals
 List of extinct birds
 Extinct in the wild
 Lazarus taxon
 List of extinct animals of India
 List of extinct animals of the Philippines

Notes

References

External links
 The Sixth Extinction
 IUCN Red List of Threatened Species

Asia
†Holocene